The 1934–35 season was Mansfield Town's fourth season in the Football League and third in the Third Division North. The Stags finished the campaign in 8th position with 47 points.

Final league table

Results

Football League Third Division North

FA Cup

Football League Third Division North Cup

Squad statistics
 Squad list sourced from

References
General
 Mansfield Town 1934–35 at soccerbase.com (use drop down list to select relevant season)

Specific

Mansfield Town F.C. seasons
Mansfield Town